Ma Jian (born 18 August 1953) is a Chinese-born British writer.

Biography
Ma was born in Qingdao, a city in Shandong Province on China's Yellow Sea coast, on 18 August 1953. As a child, he was the pupil of a painter who had been persecuted as a Rightist. After his school education was cut short by the Cultural Revolution, he studied by himself, copying out a Chinese dictionary word by word. At fifteen, he joined a propaganda arts troupe, and was later assigned a job as a watchmender's apprentice. For a few years he worked in a petrochemical plant near Beijing, then in 1979, moved to the capital and became a photojournalist for a magazine published by the All China Federation of Trade Unions. During this time, he joined the 'underground' No Name art group, the Yuanmingyuan poetry group, and the April photographers' group. He held clandestine exhibitions of his paintings in his one-room shack in Nanxiao Lane, which became a meeting point for dissident artists and writers of Beijing. 
	
In 1983, his paintings were denounced during the Anti-Spiritual Pollution Campaign, and he was placed in detention. After his release, he resigned from his job and set off on a three-year journey through China, selling his paintings and stories as he went. When he returned to Beijing in 1986, he wrote Stick Out Your Tongue, a novella inspired by his travels through Tibet. Its publication in the official journal People's Literature in February 1987 coincided with a nationwide crackdown on the arts, and the government publicly denounced the work as an example of bourgeois liberalism. All copies of the journal were confiscated and destroyed, and a blanket ban was placed on the future publications of Ma Jian's books.

Just before this event, Ma Jian had moved to Hong Kong, where speech freedoms are much higher. He wrote Bardo, a novel about two doomed lovers who are reincarnated through Chinese history, and The Nine Crossroads, about a group of sent-down youth who are sent to a remote mountain inhabited by a primitive tribe.

In 1989, Ma Jian returned to Beijing and took part in the democracy protests. After the Tiananmen massacre, he remained in the capital and wrote The Noodle Maker, a dark political satire. For the next few years, he travelled back and forth between Hong Kong and China, editing, briefly, the Hong Kong arts magazine, Wen Yi Bao, and setting up the New Era publishing company and the literary journal Trends, which published essays and novels banned in China.

After the Handover of Hong Kong to China in 1997, Ma Jian moved to Germany to take up a post teaching Chinese literature at Ruhr University, and to work on Beijing Coma, a novel about the Tiananmen massacre and the decade of political repression and economic growth that followed it. In 1999, he moved to London and wrote Red Dust, a fictionalised account of his journey through China in the 1980s, which won the 2002 Thomas Cook Travel Book Award. He returned to China regularly, and resumed work on Beijing Coma, which was finally published in 2008 and won the 2009 Index on Censorship T.R. Fyvel Book Award and the 2010 Athens Prize for Literature. In 2008–2009, he travelled extensively through the remote interior of China to research The Dark Road, a novel that explores the One Child Policy, published by Chatto & Windus and Penguin in 2013.

In 2001, he collaborated in founding the Independent Chinese PEN Centre, a branch of PEN International, became its board member in 2003–2005 and 2009–2011, a member of its Freedom to Write Committee since 2003, and director of its Press & Translation Committee since 2011.

Ma Jian is a vocal critic of China's Communist government. His works explore themes and subjects that are taboo in China. He has continually called for greater freedom of expression and the release of jailed writers and other political prisoners. As a result, his books have been banned in China for the last 25 years, and since the summer of 2011, he has been denied entry into the mainland. Despite the restrictions placed on him, Ma Jian has become a leading Chinese writer, internationally distinguished with his works translated into a great number of languages, including English, French, Spanish, German, Swedish, Norwegian, Catalan, Japanese, Dutch, Hebrew, Romanian, Turkish, Greek, Polish, Korean, Italian and Portuguese.

In April 2012, while attending the London Book Fair, Ma used red paint to smear a cross over his face and a copy of his banned book Beijing Coma and called his Chinese publisher a "mouthpiece of the Chinese communist party" after being "manhandled" while attempting to present the book to the director of the General Administration of Press and Publication and the director of National Copyright Administration, Liu Binjie, at the fair.

In November 2018, Ma was a guest at the Hong Kong International Literary Festival. Tai Kwun, the venue for the events, initially cancelled his two talks, because it did not want to "become a platform to promote the political interests of any individual", but subsequently reversed course. The incident sparked public outcry in Hong Kong. Many related this with the recent Victor Mallet visa controversy and the cancellation of Badiucao's exhibition, complaining that China was covertly silencing critics in the autonomous territory and curbing her autonomy.

He lives in London with his partner and translator, Flora Drew, and their four children.

Work
Ma came to the attention of the English-speaking world with his story collection Stick Out Your Tongue, translated into English in 2006. The stories are set in Tibet. Their most remarked-upon feature is that traditional Tibetan culture is not idealised, but rather depicted as harsh and often inhuman; one reviewer noted that the "stories sketch multi-generational incest, routine sexual abuse and ritual rape". The book was banned in China as a "vulgar and obscene book that defames the image of our Tibetan compatriots."

Ma's travel memoir Red Dust: A Path Through China (2001) is about his wanderings through remote areas of China from 1983 to 1986 as a long-haired jobless vagabond. It won the 2002 Thomas Cook Travel Book Award.

His novel Beijing Coma (2008) tells the story of the Tiananmen Square protests of 1989 from the point of view of the fictional Dai Wei, a participant in the events left in a coma by the violent end of the protests. The comatose narrator functions as a metaphor for the ability to remember and the inability to act. It has received critical acclaim, with Tom Deveson of The Times describing it as "epic in scope but intimate in feeling … magnificent" and the Financial Times calling it "an epic yet intimate work that deserves to be recognised and to endure as the great Tienanmen novel.”

Awards and honours
 2002 Thomas Cook Travel Book Award
 2009 China Free Culture Prize
 2009 Index on Censorship TR Fyvel Book Award
 2010 Athens Prize for Literature

List of works
Books of short stories and novellas

 Stick Out Your Tongue (亮出你的舌苔或空空荡荡) (1987) banned in China, English version: Chatto & Windus and Farrar, Straus & Giroux (2006)
 A Dog's Life (你拉狗屎) (1987)
 The Lament (怨碑) (1996)

Novels

 Bardo (思惑) (1989)
 The Noodle Maker (拉面者) (1991), English version: Chatto & Windus (2004) and Farrar, Straus & Giroux (2005)
 The Nine Crossroads (九条叉路) (1993)
 Red Dust (非法流浪) (2003), English version: Chatto & Windus and Pantheon Books (2001)
 Beijing Coma (肉之土) (2009) banned in China, English version: Chatto & Windus and Farrar, Straus and Giroux (2008)
 The Dark Road (阴之道), Yun chi dao (2012), Taipei:  Yun Chen Publishing.  English version: Chatto & Windus and Penguin (2013)
 China Dream (2018) English version translated by Flora Drew: Chatto & Windus, 

Other collections

 Ma Jian's Road (马建之路), travel notes and photographs (1987)
 Life Companion (人生伴侣), collection of poems and essays (1996)
 Intimately Related (发生关系), collection of essays (1997)

See also
Novel

References

External links

 Ma Jian at FSG
 Ma Jian: Bio, excerpts, interviews and articles in the archives of the Prague Writers' Festival
 Some of his writing (in Chinese)
 Ma Jian at PEN Festival of World Literature
 review of Beijing Coma
 Excerpt from Beijing Coma at BookBrowse, plus reading guide & reviews
 Information about Beijing Coma and the author, with review excerpts

1953 births
Living people
Chinese activists
Writers from Qingdao
British writers of Chinese descent
Chinese male short story writers
Chinese male novelists
Chinese emigrants to the United Kingdom
Hong Kong people of Chinese descent
People with acquired permanent residency of Hong Kong
People's Republic of China short story writers
Short story writers from Shandong
Chinese anti-communists